A landaulet or landaulette carriage is a cut-down (coupé) version of a landau horse-drawn carriage. The landaulette retains the rear half of the landau's two-part folding top.

The earliest use of the word shown in the Oxford English Dictionary is in a patent of 1771, using the former spelling landawlet.

A variant of the brougham called a brougham-landaulette had a top collapsible from the rear doors backward.

The name landaulette was also used for the  landaulet car body style, where the passengers are covered by a removable top and the chauffeur is usually covered and separated from passengers by a division.

References

Carriages